Trapezites heteromacula, the orange white-spot skipper, is a butterfly of the family Hesperiidae. It is found on Australia's Cape York.

The wingspan is about 30 mm.

The larvae feed on Lomandra filiformis and Lomandra longifolia.

External links
 Australian Caterpillars

Trapezitinae
Butterflies described in 1902